Hellerstein is a surname. Notable people with the surname include:

Alvin Hellerstein (born 1933), American judge
Joseph M. Hellerstein (born 1968), American computer scientist
Judith K. Hellerstein, American economist
Kathryn Hellerstein (born 1952), American academic
Lynn Hellerstein, American optometrist, speaker, and author